Posht Ab District was a district (bakhsh) in Zabol County, Sistan and Baluchestan Province, Iran. At the 2006 census, its population was 40,434, in 8,737 families.  The district had one city: Adimi. It was separated from Zabol County to create Nimruz County.

References 

Zabol County
Districts of Sistan and Baluchestan Province